Sylvia Nancy Goaman ( Priestley; 30 April 1924 – 3 August 2006) was a British graphic designer, specialising in textile, postage stamp, and stained glass window design. In collaboration with her husband, Michael Goaman, she is known for designing a range of commemorative postage stamps: her husband was often given sole credit for what were mainly her design.

References

1924 births
2006 deaths
British graphic designers
British stamp designers
Women graphic designers
British stained glass artists and manufacturers